Las Casas Filipinas de Acuzar (Spanish for "Acuzar's Philippine Houses") is a beach resort, hotel, convention center and heritage destination in Bagac, Bataan, Philippines.

History 
Jose Acuzar, the owner of New San Jose Builders, Inc., started to rebuild Spanish colonial-era mansions in Bagac in 2003. In March 2010, the area was opened to the public as the Las Casas Filipinas de Acuzar. It was placed under the management of Genesis Hotels and Resorts Corporation.

Las Casas Filipinas temporarily closed in early 2020 due to community quarantine measures imposed in response to the COVID-19 pandemic but eventually reopened in July 2020.

It was used as a filming location of Goyo: Ang Batang Heneral, Maria Clara at Ibarra, etc.

Features 
For its lodging facilities, Las Casas Filipinas has 128 guest rooms and 63 "elite casas" as of January 2021.

Heritage houses

The main attraction of the Las Casas Filipinas de Acuzar is its heritage houses, which were transplanted from outside Bagac, Bataan. The houses are disassembled from their original location and reconstructed inside the premise of the Las Casas Filipinas. This method of heritage conservation has been contentious among conservationists since they believed that their original communities could have benefitted from the structures had they been restored on site. The heritage park's proponent Gerry Acuzar claimed that he went with the method in order to save the structures from decay and neglect. The heritage park was lauded by the Department of Tourism in 2021 under Secretary Bernadette Romulo-Puyat for its preservation efforts.

Houses included in the Las Casas Filipinas are evaluated for their historical, cultural and architectural value. Most structures dates back to the Spanish colonial era, but some buildings were built later such as the Casa Lubao which was built in 1920 during the American era. The heritage park also include a torogan, a Maranao royal clan house from Lanao in Mindanao.

Among the notable houses transplanted to the heritage park are: Casa Bizantina, Casa Hidalgo, Casa Jaen I, and Casa Unisan.

Other structures
Las Casas Filipinas de Acuzar also hosts a small church known as the Sanctuario de San Jose. Other features include the Napiya Spa, a swimming pool. The Tulay ni Lola Basyang is a bridge that crosses the Umagol River and is a replica of the old Puente de España in Manila.

References

External links

 Official website - Las Casas Filipinas

Open-air museums in the Philippines
Buildings and structures in Bataan
Tourist attractions in Bataan